A turn-based MMORPG is a type of massively multiplayer online role-playing game that utilizes turn-based game flow, meaning that game actions are partitioned into well-defined and visible parts, called turns. A player of a turn-based game is allowed a period of analysis before committing to a game action, ensuring a separation between the game flow and the thinking process. Many turn-based MMORPGs are text-based, but there are a few games which depict their environments with fully animated graphics, such as Atlantica Online.

Text-based and browser games

Many multiplayer browser games give the player a set number of turns which are replenished at set increments of time or through in-game items. Early BBS door games were turn-based, and browser games that use server-side scripting (such as PHP, ASP, Ruby, Perl, Python or Java) operate on similar principles.  Most of these games use text or a combination of text and still images to depict the game world.

Games like Kingdom of Loathing play like traditional turn-based role-playing video games, with players given a new allotment of turns each day.

Graphical games
Relatively few fully animated, graphical multiplayer RPGs include turn-based gameplay. 

Dofus, Dofus Arena and Wakfu are turn-based tactical role-playing games developed by Ankama Games. They feature  isometric, sprite-based graphics.
Atlantica Online is a strategic, turn-based MMORPG launched in 2008. While the game's battles are turn-based, during each turn the player must issue commands to their characters within a time limit of 30 seconds, making combat fast-paced.
Darkwind: War on Wheels is a 3D turn-based car combat MMORPG which, similar to Atlantica Online, provides 30-second periods in which players issue commands to their vehicles. Game turns represent one-second of simulated time, and cars are moved using physics calculations.
Concerto Gate uses a combat system that combines turn-based and real time, similar to Final Fantasy's "Active Time Battle" system.
Wonderland Online Wonderland Online is 2D MMORPG by IGG.
Digimon Battle Even though Digimon Battle was originally released in South Korea nearly 10 years ago, WeMade decided to launch the game in North America in March 2010. 
Wizard101 Wizard101 is a 3D turn based MMORPG with card based gameplay.
Toontown Online is a 3D turn based game inspired by the cartoon world of Disney, while the official game has shut down, multiple fan-made servers have taken its place.

See also 
Massively multiplayer online game
Role-playing video game
Turns, rounds and time-keeping systems in games (Real-time vs. turn-based gameplay)

References

Massively multiplayer online role-playing games